Joan Backes (born in Milwaukee, Wisconsin) is an American artist. Backes is known for her paintings which record different species of tree bark and for her installations, most recently her house series. Her work addresses issues of nature in contemporary society.

Early life
Backes received her MFA in Painting from Northwestern University, Department of Art Theory and Practice where she worked with Ed Paschke and William Conger. She received an MA in Painting at the University of Missouri. She received her undergraduate degree from the University of Iowa, Iowa City, Iowa.

Career
Since 2000 her paintings have focused on trees and on the effects of overdevelopment. Her installations focus on the house as image and symbol, and often incorporate site-specific materials. Backes' Carpet of Leaves often use over 1000 leaves in each installation, bringing the outside in to the gallery or museum.

Public collections currently holding Backes' work include the Newport Art Museum in Newport, Rhode Island, the Rhode Island School of Design Museum in Providence, Rhode Island, Smith College Museum of Art in Northampton, Massachusetts, The Milwaukee Art Museum in Milwaukee, Wisconsin, the Nelson-Atkins Museum of Art in Kansas City, Missouri, the Joslyn Art Museum in Omaha, Nebraska, the Racine Art Museum in Racine, Wisconsin,  the Mulvane Art Museum in Topeka, Kansas, the Nerman Museum of Art in Overland Park, Kansas, the Rauma Art Museum in Finland, the Aberdeen Art Gallery in Scotland, the Reykjavik Art Museum in Iceland, the Hafnarborg Institute of Culture and Fine Art Museum in Iceland, the Spencer Museum of Art in Lawrence, Kansas, the Wright Museum of Art in Beloit, Wisconsin, the Boston Public Library in Boston, Massachusetts, the John Hay Library at Brown University, Providence, Rhode Island, and the Beach Museum of Art, KSU, among others.

Permanent installations of her work include Internationales Waldkunst Odenwald Forest, Darmstadt, Germany; Berlin / Grunewald, Berlin, Germany; Linnaean Garden, Uppsala, Sweden; Silpakorn University Art Atrium, Bangkok, Thailand; and Nova Scotia College of Art and Design, Canada.

Backes has taught at Brown University, Nova Scotia College of Art and Design, Maine College of Art Graduate Program, Rhode Island School of Design, The Kansas City Art Institute, and Northwestern University.

References

External links 
 Joan Backes Official Website
 Milwaukee Journal - Newspaper House Installation
 ar2com - Audio Interview with Backes, Forest House Deniz Köse (13 sept. 2010)

Northwestern University faculty
Maine College of Art faculty
Brown University faculty
Rhode Island School of Design faculty
Kansas City Art Institute
Artists from Milwaukee
Year of birth missing (living people)
Northwestern University alumni
University of Missouri alumni
University of Iowa alumni
Living people